European Journal of Cell Biology is a monthly peer-reviewed scientific journal that was established in 1969 as Cytobiologie. It is published by Elsevier. Since March 2021, the editor in chief is Dr. Miguel Vicente-Manzanares (IBMCC, CSIC, Salamanca, Spain) and the Deputy Editor is Dr. rer. nat. Klemens Rottner (Zoological Institute Technische Universität Braunschweig). The current editorial team took over from the editorial team of Stefan Linder (University Medical Center Hamburg-Eppendorf), Manfred Schliwa (Ludwig Maximilian University of Munich), and Sabine Werner (ETH Zurich). The journal covers research on cell biology. Publishing formats include original research articles, reviews, and short communications. Its current impact factor is 6.02.

Abstracting and indexing
European Journal of Cell Biology is abstracted and indexed in:

References

External links 
 

Biology in Europe
Molecular and cellular biology journals
Elsevier academic journals
English-language journals
Publications established in 1969
Monthly journals